Ähtäri Zoo is a  zoo in Ähtäri, Finland that was opened in 1973. It is the second largest zoo in Finland, and is a member of the European Association of Zoos and Aquaria (EAZA).

History

Köpi the moose was the first animal at the zoo. After several years, wolves and lynxes were added. However the zoo's most famous residents are probably the bears, Santeri and his mate Santra, who have lived at the zoo almost since its founding. In 2003 the Korkeasaari Zoo in Helsinki gifted snow leopards to Ähtäri Zoo for their 30th anniversary. By 2006 there were 65 animals, mostly from the coniferous zone. In 2018, two giant pandas have arrived from China.

Since its establishment, one goal of the Ähtäri Zoo has been to create natural living conditions for the animals. The  area, in which the terrain and vegetation vary widely, has provided excellent opportunities to implement EAZAs basic ideas about how to treat animals in captivity. In addition, the zoo tries to increase knowledge of species and nature, and to share educational information with the public.

Animals

Animals at the zoo include snow leopards, wolves, bears, wolverines, lynx, foxes, otters, beavers, European bison, wild boar, roe deer, fallow deer, reindeer, white-tailed deer, snowy owls, eagle owls, and waterfowl.

References

External links

Zoos in Finland
Buildings and structures in South Ostrobothnia
Tourist attractions in South Ostrobothnia
1973 establishments in Finland
Zoos established in 1973